Harry Delbert Cassady  (born Harry Delbert Cassaday) (July 20, 1880 – April 19, 1969), was a professional baseball player who played outfield in the Major Leagues for the 1904 Pittsburgh Pirates and 1905 Washington Senators. He went to Illinois Wesleyan University.

External links

1880 births
1969 deaths
Major League Baseball outfielders
Baseball players from Illinois
Pittsburgh Pirates players
Washington Senators (1901–1960) players
Bloomington Blues players
Bloomington Bloomers players
Kansas City Blues (baseball) players
Toledo Mud Hens players
Denver Grizzlies (baseball) players